Broad Canyon Wilderness is a 13,902-acre (5,625 ha) wilderness area in the Organ Mountains-Desert Peaks National Monument managed by the U.S. Bureau of Land Management in the U.S. state of New Mexico.  Established in 2019, this Wilderness located on the eastern end of the Sierra de las Uvas, contains small canyons created by water eroded lava flows opening into the surrounding Chihuahuan Desert.

See also
List of U.S. Wilderness Areas

References

External links
Broad Canyon Wilderness - BLM
Broad Canyon Wilderness Map - BLM
Organ Mountains Desert Peaks National Monument Wilderness - New Mexico Wilderness Alliance

IUCN Category Ib
Wilderness areas of New Mexico
Organ Mountains–Desert Peaks National Monument
Protected areas of Doña Ana County, New Mexico
Protected areas established in 2019